The Kerry County Board of the Gaelic Athletic Association (GAA) (or Kerry GAA), one of the 32 county boards of the GAA in Ireland, and responsible for Gaelic games in County Kerry, organises sports competitions for the county's clubs. Leagues and Championships are played. The competitions are organised from senior to under-age level. The following is a list of such competitions.

Football

Senior Football Championship
The Kerry Senior Football Championship is the top level football competition in Kerry.

The Kerry County Club Championship is a competition between the clubs (excluding divisions), who participate in the Kerry Senior Football Championship.

Intermediate Football Championship
The Kerry Intermediate Football Championship is the second level football competition in Kerry.

Junior Football Championship
The Kerry Junior Football Championship is the third level football competition in Kerry.

Novice Football Championship
The Kerry Novice Football Championship is the fourth level football competition in Kerry.            
Novice Finalists
1994 Na Gaeil 1:12 Ballydonoghue 1:10
1995 Firies.     2:07 St Michaels/Foilmore 1:08
1996 Finuge.  0:09 Dromid Pearses.          0:07
1997 Knocknagashel 1:10 St Michaels/Foilmore 1:07
1998 St Michaels/Foilmore 1:12 Dromid Pearses 1:05
1999 Dromid Pearses 3:13 Listry 1:04
2000 Keel 1:08 Renard 0:05
2001 Renard 0:15 Tousist 0:11
2002 Duagh 0:11 Listry 0:05
2003 Keel 1:08 Beale 0:05
2004 Glenbeigh/Glencar 2:05 Churchill 1:06
2005 Beale 1:13 Tousist 0:15
2006 Moyvane 2:13 Na Gaeil 1:09
2007 Cromane 0:11 Ballydonghue 2:03
2008 Tousist 1:06 Scartaglin 0:07
2009 Churchill 3:06 Brosna 1:09
2010 Na Gaeil 1:10 Listry 0:09
2011 Brosna 1:09 Scartaglin 0:11
2012 Scartaglin 1:09 Lios Póil 0:05
2013 Templenoe 2:15 Listry 2:13
2014 Listry 0:15 Lios Póil 1:11
2015 St Senans 1:10 Lios Póil 1:09
In 2016, The Kerry Club Championships were restructured, with immediate effects on the naming of several competitions. The Junior Championship was renamed the Premier Junior, Novice was renamed the Junior Championship and the Novice Shield became the Novice Championship.
2016 Fossa 2:12 Beale 0:08
2017 Listry 2:12 Castlegregory 2:11
2018 Lios Póil 1:11 Beale 1:08

Underage

Kerry Under-21 Football Championship
This is the highest level competition for the under-21s.

Kerry Minor Football Championship
This is the highest level competition for the under-18s.

Hurling

Senior Hurling Championships
The Kerry Senior Hurling Championship is the top level hurling competition in Kerry.

Intermediate Hurling Championship
The Kerry Intermediate Hurling Championship is the second level hurling competition in Kerry.

Junior Hurling Championship
The Kerry Junior Hurling Championship is the third level hurling competition in Kerry

Underage

Kerry Under-21 Hurling Championship
This is the highest level competition for the under-21s.

Kerry Minor Hurling Championship
This is the highest level competition for the under-18s.

References

Competitions